The Secretary for Public Security was the top position for a law enforcement officer in Portuguese Macau.

Organization
The Secretary headed the Secretariat for Public Security branch, which as responsible for the disciplinary services in Macau. The department's name had a slight change in 1999 to be referred to as the Secretariat for Security.
 Macau Security Force
 Public Security Police Force
 Public Security Forces Affairs Bureau
 Judiciary Police
 Unitary Police Service
 Macau Prisons
 Fire Services Bureau
 Academy for Public Security Forces
 Customs of Macau SAR

List of Secretariats
 Jorge Noronha e Silveira 1996-1999 as Deputy Secretary for Justice Affairs of Macau; law professor and now Deputy Ombudsman of Justice
 Manuel Morge - pre-1999
Other key officials include:
 Cheong Kuoc Vá - Chief of the Public Security Police Force

References

External links
 Casa de Macau - references to former Portuguese secretaries

Government departments and agencies of Macau
Members of the Executive Council of Macau
Macau
Political office-holders in Macau
Positions of the Macau Government
1999 disestablishments in Macau